The 1952 Oregon State Beavers football team represented Oregon State College in the Pacific Coast Conference (PCC) during the 1952 college football season.  In their fourth season under head coach Kip Taylor, the Beavers compiled a 2–7 record (1–6 in PCC, last), and were outscored 267 to 123.

The team played its home games at Multnomah Stadium in Portland, with one on campus at Bell Field in Corvallis, a 27–6 homecoming loss to Idaho in the last varsity game at the venue.

Schedule

References

External links
 Game program: Oregon State at Washington State – October 25, 1952

Oregon State
Oregon State Beavers football seasons
Oregon State Beavers football